Richard Royall "Duck" Baker IV (born July 30, 1949) is an American acoustic fingerstyle guitarist who plays in a variety of styles: jazz, blues, gospel, ragtime, folk, and Irish and Scottish music. He has written many instruction books for guitar.

Musical career
His reputation rests on his work as a solo fingerstyle guitarist in multiple genres: Irish and Scottish music, American folk music, ragtime, gospel, and blues.  He was born Richard Royall Baker IV on July 30, 1949 in Washington, D.C. and grew up in Virginia. As a teenager he played in rock bands before becoming interested in acoustic blues and jazz. He listened to the Jazz Crusaders, Jimmy Smith, and Miles Davis, but Misterioso by Thelonious Monk got his attention most at the age of 16. He learned about ragtime from his teacher, stride pianist Buck Evans.

In the early 1970s, he moved to San Francisco and performed a wide range of material, which can be heard on his debut album, There's Something for Everyone in America, on Kicking Mule Records. In addition to developing his solo style, he immersed himself in the local swing jazz and avant-garde jazz scene. He was in a swing guitar duet with Thom Keats and a bluegrass band. From the late 1970s to the middle 1980s, he lived in Europe, spending time among free jazz musicians in London. During these years, he played with Eugene Chadbourne, John Zorn, Henry Kaiser, Woody Mann, and Jim Nichols. He toured throughout the world and released an album of Scottish and Irish music before returning to America in 1987.

Discography

As leader
 There's Something for Everyone in America (Kicking Mule, 1975)
 When You Wore a Tulip (Kicking Mule, 1975)
 The King of Bongo Bong (Kicking Mule, 1977)
 The Kid on the Mountain (Kicking Mule, 1980)
 The Art of Fingerstyle Jazz Guitar (Kicking Mule, 1980)
 Under Your Heart (Edition Collage, 1985)
 The Music of O'Carolan with Steve Tilston, Seth Austen, Angelo Eleuteri (Shanachie, 1987)
 A Thousand Words with John Renbourn (Acoustic Music, 1994)
 The Clear Blue Sky (Acoustic Music, 1995)
 Spinning Song: Duck Baker Plays the Music of Herbie Nichols (Avant, 1996)
 Opening the Eyes of Love (Shanachie, 1996)
 Northern Skies, Southern Blues with Stefan Grossman (Shanachie, 1997)
 Ms. Right (Acoustic Music, 1997)
 Out of the Past with Jamie Findlay (Day Job, 2001)
 The Ducks Palace (Incus, 2009)
 Everything That Rises Must Converge (Mighty Quinn, 2009)
 The Roots and Branches of American Music (Les Cousins, 2009)
 The County Set (Southern Summer, 2016)
 Outside (Emanem, 2016)
 Les Blues Du Richmond: Demos & Outtakes 1973–1979 (Tomkins Square, 2018)
 Duck Baker Plays Monk (Triple Point, 2018)
 Live with Roswell Rudd (Dot Time, 2021) recorded in 2002 and 2004

As sideman
With Eugene Chadbourne
 Guitar Trios (Parachute, 1977)
 Vision-Ease Vol 2 (House of Chadula, 1978)
 Wild Partners (House of Chadula, 1998)

With others
 John James, Descriptive Guitar Instrumentals (Kicking Mule, 1976)
 Stefan Grossman, Thunder on the Run (Kicking Mule, 1980)
 Roswell Rudd, Broad Strokes (Knitting Factory, 2000)

References

External links
 
 [ Allmusic]
 Duck Baker: Folk ist Jazz ist Folk (German)

American blues guitarists
American male guitarists
American jazz guitarists
Fingerstyle guitarists
1949 births
Living people
Guitarists from Washington, D.C.
20th-century American guitarists
20th-century American male musicians
American male jazz musicians
Incus Records artists
Shanachie Records artists
Emanem Records artists
Sonet Records artists